DC Thomson is a media company based in Dundee, Scotland. Founded by David Couper Thomson in 1905, it is best known for publishing The Dundee Courier, The Evening Telegraph and The Sunday Post newspapers, and the comics Oor Wullie, The Broons, The Beano, The Dandy and  Commando. It also owns the Aberdeen Journals Group which publishes the Press and Journal. The company owns several websites, including Findmypast, and owned the now defunct social media site Friends Reunited.

History
The company began as a branch of the Thomson family business when William Thomson became the sole proprietor of Charles Alexander & Company, publishers of Dundee Courier and Daily Argus. In 1884, David Couper Thomson took over the publishing business, and established it as D.C. Thomson in 1905. The firm flourished, and took its place as the third J in the "Three Js", the traditional summary of Dundee industry ('jute, jam and journalism'). 

Thomson was notable for his conservatism, vigorously opposing the introduction of trade unions into his workforce, and for refusing to employ Catholics. Among historians of popular culture, the firm has "excited a good deal of interest precisely because it has always shrouded its activities in secrecy ... [it] has never allowed scholars access to its archives, and has declined to participate in exhibitions of juvenile literature."

By 2010, the company was producing more than 100 million comics, magazines, and newspapers every year from offices in Dundee, Glasgow, Manchester, and London. In June 2010, 350 jobs at DC Thomson were made redundant with the closure of the West Ward Printworks in Dundee, along with a section of the Kingsway Print Plant.

Although the principal offices are now located outside Dundee city centre at Kingsway, the Courier Building at Meadowside has been retained as the company headquarters. This 1902 building was designed to resemble an American red stone, steel reinforced office block. When a nine-storey tower extension was added in 1960, the architect T. Lindsay Grey kept the same style. The building underwent extensive renovation and reopened to employees in 2017, and is able to accommodate 600 workers.

In 2009 DC Thomson acquired the magazine company This England Publishing, which included This England magazine and Evergreen quarterly magazine. In the same year DC Thomson acquired the Friends Reunited website from ITV for £25.6m, but by 2011 was valued at £5.2m and was eventually shut down completely in February 2016. In 2013 there were nine job losses at This England Publishing with the editorial team remaining but relocating in Cheltenham.

As of 2016, the company posted an increase in pre-tax profits and revenue whilst employing over 2,000 workers. Despite the falling circulation of newspapers and magazines, DC Thomson attributed the rising profits to company-wide cuts to operating costs and good figures in digital revenues and events. The company went on to say that they would continue to branch out their brand into new areas to support the traditional newspaper and magazine divisions.

In February 2023, it was announced that several "well-loved" titles would be closed and employees would be made redundant as part of a wider restructuring. On 9 February 2023, it was announced that Shout, Living, Platinum Magazine, Evergreen, Animals & You and Animal Planet would be closed with 300 employees being made redundant.

Subsidiaries

Brightsolid
Brightsolid is a data centre and cloud-based hosting company based in Dundee that DC Thomson established in 1995 as Scotland Online. It became Brightsolid in 2008, organised into two divisions: Brightsolid Online Publishing (BSOP) and Brightsolid Online Technology (BSOT). The two divisions were split into separate businesses in October 2013, and Brightsolid Online Publishing was renamed DC Thomson Family History, with Annelies van den Belt as chief executive.

Findmypast
Findmypast Limited (formerly DC Thomson Family History, until 2015) owns a variety of large genealogy sites worldwide, including Findmypast, Genes Reunited and Mocavo. The company had contracts to digitise archives for the Imperial War Museum and the British Library, where it was making the British Newspaper Archive searchable.

Publications

D.C. Thomson publications include:
Sunday Post
The Courier
The Evening Telegraph
My Weekly
The Scots Magazine
The People's Friend
The Beano
The Dandy
Commando
Jackie
Shout
Bunty

Gallery

See also
British comics
Ellis Watson

References

Further reading

 Joseph McAleer, Popular Reading and Publishing in Britain: 1914–1950, Oxford University Press, 1992. Includes a chapter on D. C. Thomson & Co. Ltd.

External links

 
1905 establishments in Scotland
Publishing companies established in 1905
Companies based in Dundee
Comic book publishing companies of Scotland
Magazine publishing companies of Scotland
Mass media companies of Scotland
Newspaper companies of Scotland
Book publishing companies of Scotland
Mass media in Dundee